"Arbolito de Naranja" is a traditional song sung by children, especially girls, in Guayaquil, Ecuador, during group games.

Lyrics

Spanish

Arbolito de naranja,

Peinecito de marfil,

Para la niña más bonita

Del Colegio de Guayaquil.

La Chanita y la Juanita

Se fueron a cortar limones;

Encontraron el árbol seco

Y se dieron de topetones.

English translation
"A little orange tree,

A little ivory comb,

For the prettiest girl

Of Guayaquil High School.

Joanie and Janie

Went to pick limes;

They found the tree all dried up

So they butted heads instead."

See also
Suo Gan

Children's songs
Ecuadorian songs
Lullabies
Songs about plants
Fictional trees
Year of song unknown
Songwriter unknown